Galleh Bacheh is a village in Qorqori Rural District, Qorqori District, Hirmand County, Sistan and Baluchestan Province, Iran. At the 2006 census, its population was 566, in 109 families.

References 

Populated places in Hirmand County